Kaldurg Fort is situated to the east of Palghar, Maharashtra, India in the Sahyadri mountain range of northern Konkan. It is strategically situated at a height of at least 475 meters above sea level, giving views of the Arabian Sea and the industrial town of Palghar to the west, as well as views of the Surya River, to the east.

This rectangular shape of a fort can easily be located from a distance. There is no specific historic sign available except fort structure. The fort is divided into the upper part and lower part due to a rectangular rock. There are few steps that separate these two parts.

It is a popular destination among hikers. The trek starts at Waghoba Khind temple on Palghar - Manor Road.

References

Forts in Maharashtra
Palghar district